Mendon Community Unit School District 4 is a unified school district that is mostly located in Mendon, a village located in Adams County, Illinois. It is composed of Unity Elementary School, Unity Middle School, and Unity High School. The current superintendent of the district is Scott D. Riddle.

List of Principals

Josh Arnsman, principal of Unity High School
Josh Arnsman, principal of Unity Middle School
Jerry Ellerman, principal of  Unity Elementary School

References

External links

Unity Elementary School
Unity Middle School
Unity High School

Education in Adams County, Illinois
School districts in Illinois